Michael D. Watkins is a Canadian-born author of books on leadership and negotiation. He is the Professor of Leadership and Organizational Change at the International Institute for Management Development in Switzerland.

Education and career
Watkins studied electrical engineering at the University of Waterloo and business and law at the University of Western Ontario. He has a PhD in decision science from Harvard University.

Watkins became an associate professor at Harvard Business School before moving to the International Institute for Management Development.

Bibliography
Breakthrough International Negotiation: How Great Negotiators Transformed the World's Toughest Post-Cold War Conflicts (with Susan Rosegrant, Jossey-Bass, 2001)
Breakthrough Business Negotiation: A Toolbox for Managers (Wiley, 2002)
Winning the Influence Game: What Every Business Leader Should Know about Government (with Mickey Edwards and Usha Thakrar, Wiley, 2002)
The First 90 Days: Proven Strategies for Getting Up to Speed Faster and Smarter (Harvard Business School Press, 2003; 2nd ed., Harvard Business Review Press, 2013)
Right from the Start: Taking Charge in a New Leadership Role (with Dan Ciampa, Harvard Business School Press, 2005)
Case Studies in U.S. Trade Negotiation (with Charan Devereaux and Robert Z. Lawrence, Institute for International Economics, 2006)
The First 90 Days in Government: Critical Success Strategies for New Public Managers at All Levels (with Peter H. Daly and Cate Reavis, Harvard Business School Press, 2006)
Shaping the Game: The New Leader's Guide to Effective Negotiating (Harvard Business School Press, 2006)
Predictable Surprises: The Disasters You Should Have Seen Coming, and how to Prevent Them (with Max H. Bazerman, Harvard Business School Press, 2008)
Your Next Move: The Leader's Guide to Navigating Major Career Transitions (Harvard Business Press, 2009)
Master Your Next Move: Proven Strategies for Navigating the First 90 Days (Harvard Business Press, 2019)

References 

Living people
Canadian male non-fiction writers
Leadership scholars
Negotiation scholars
Year of birth missing (living people)
21st-century Canadian non-fiction writers
Canadian expatriates in France
Harvard Business School faculty
Canadian expatriates in the United States
University of Waterloo alumni
University of Western Ontario alumni
Harvard University alumni